Holbrook Farm is a historic farm complex located near Traphill, Wilkes County, North Carolina. The house was built about 1826, and is a vernacular two story, three bay frame dwelling with Federal style design elements.  Also on the property are the contributing log granary, log spring house, a log smokehouse, a log corn crib, a frame barn, and a board-and-batten two-room school dormitory that once served the Trap Hill Institute and moved to the property in the early-20th century.

It was listed on the National Register of Historic Places in 1978.

References

Farms on the National Register of Historic Places in North Carolina
Federal architecture in North Carolina
Houses completed in 1826
Buildings and structures in Wilkes County, North Carolina
National Register of Historic Places in Wilkes County, North Carolina
1826 establishments in North Carolina